Abraxas miranda is a species of moth belonging to the family Geometridae. It was described by Arthur Gardiner Butler in 1878. It is known from Japan.

The wingspan is 18–26 mm.

Subspecies
Abraxas miranda miranda
Abraxas miranda aesia Prout, 1925

References

Abraxini
Moths of Japan
Moths described in 1878